Under Maharaja Ranjit Singh, the Sikh ruler of Punjab, a large variety of soldiers served as Generals of the Sikh Khalsa Army. Though many of these generals were Sikhs, many others hailed from a diversity of clans, castes, and regions.

This includes previous generals from the 15th century to 18th century.

Early Sikh Period

Guru HarGobind Sahib Ji's Generals 

 Jarnail Baba Praga Ji
 Jathedar Baba Bidhi Chand Ji
 Jarnail Bhai Singha Purohit Ji
 Sahibzada Tegh Bahadur Ji
 Baba Gurditta Udasi Ji
 Jarnail Bhai Parasram Ji
 Jathedaar Bhai Mathura Bhatt Ji
 Jathedaar Bhai Kirat Bhatt Ji
 Jarnail Bhai Lakhi Das Ji
 Jarnail Bhai Jati Mall/Malik Purohit Ji
 Jarnail Rao Mandan Rathore Ji
 Jarnail Bhai Jattu Das Ji
 Jathedaar Bhai Saktu Ji
 Jathedaar Bhai Nanu Ji
 Jarnail Bhai Banno Ji
 Shaheed Rao Ballu Ji
 Jarnail Bhai Kalyana Ji
 Baba Budha Ji
 Jarnail Bhai Peda Das Ji
 Jarnail Bhai Mukand Ram Ji
 Jathedaar Bhai Pirana Ji
 Jathedaar Bhai Jagannath Ji

Guru Har Rai Ji's Generals 

 Shaheed Amar Chand Ji
 Bhai Lakhi Das Ji
 Bhai Jati Malik Ji Purohit

Guru Gobind Singh Ji's Generals
 Peer Buddhan Shah Ji
 Jarnail Kale Khan Ji
 Bhai Lal Singh Ji
 Bhai Jiwan Singh Ji
 Bhai Kirpa Singh Ji
 Bhai Sanmukh Singh Ji
 Bhai Daya Singh Ji Pyare
 Bhai Mokham Singh Ji Pyare
 Bhai Sahib Singh Ji Pyare
 Bhai Himmat Singh Ji Pyare
 Bhai Dharam Singh Ji Pyare
 Vir Bhai Tehil Singh Ji
 Vir Bhai Fateh Singh Ji
 Vir Bhai Ishar Singh Ji
 Vir Bhai Ram Singh Ji
 Vir Bhai Deva Singh Ji
 Vir Bhai Daya Singh Ji Purohit
 Sahibzada Ajit Singh Ji
 Sahibzada Zorawar Singh Palit Ji
 Jarnail Bhai Udai Singh Ji
 Jarnail Bhai Nahar Singh Ji 
 Jarnail Bhai Sher Singh Ji
 Hathmar Bhai Bachittar Singh Ji
 Jarnail Bhai Jati Malik Ji Purohit 
 Jarnail Shaheed Bhai Mani Singh Ji
 Jarnail Bhai Mahan Singh 
 Jarnail Mai Bhago Kaur Ji
 Jarnail Bibi Deep Kaur Ji

Misl and Afghan Period 

 Bhai Bota Singh Ji
 Bhai Garja Singh Ji
 Bhai Mehtab Singh Ji
 Bhai Sukha Singh Ji
 Mata Sahib Kaur Ji
 Bhai Gurbaksh Singh Ji
 Jathedar Binod Singh Ji
 Jathedar Darbara Singh Ji
 Pandit Ran Singh Pada Ji
Sultan-Al-Quam Nawab Kapur Singh Ji
 Raja Khushal Singh Ji
 Raja Budh Singh Ji
 Raja Bhuma Singh Dhillon
 Raja Hari Singh Dhillon
 Raja Gulab Singh Khatri
 Raja Sahib Singh 
 Sultan-Al-Quam Jassa Singh Ahluwalia Ji
 Raja Bhag Singh Ahluwalia
 Maharaja Jassa Singh Ramgharia Ji
 Maharaja Jodh Singh Ramgharia Ji
 Maharaja Charat Singh Sukherchakia Ji
 Maharaja Maha Singh Sukerchakia Ji
 Raja Jai Singh Kanhaiya
 Raja Gurbaksh Singh Kanhaiya 
 Rani Sada Kaur
 Raja Phul Singh Sidhu
 Gulab Singh Rathore Dallevala Ji
 Raja Tara Singh Ghaiba Ji
 Raja Heera Singh Sandhu Ji
Raja Ran Singh Nakai Ji
Rani Karmo Kaur 
 Raja Karora Singh Ji
 Raja Sangat Singh Ji
 Raja Mohar Singh Ji
 Bhai Sudha Singh Ji
Shaheed Baba Deep Singh Ji
 Shaheed Karam Singh Ji
 Raja Gurbax Singh Ji
 Maharaja Baghel Singh Ji
 Misr Chhajju Mall Chaudhuri (Kanhaiya Katra)

Sikh Empire 

 Jarnail Sardar Hari Singh Nalwa
  Jarnail Sardar Raja Mahan Singh Mirpuria
 Jarnail Dewan Mokham Chand
  Jarnail Misr Diwan Chand 
Jarnail Dewan Sawan Mal Chopra
 Diwan_Sawan_Mal_Chopra
Jarnail Mulraj Chopra
 Diwan Mulraj Chopra
 Jarnail Zorawar Singh Kahluria
 Jarnail Jawala Singh Padhania
 Jarnail Jawahir Singh Aulakh
Raja Gulab Singh
 Jarnail Misr Sukh Raj
Jarnail Ghaus Khan 
Jarnail Ilahi Bakhsh 
 Raja Khushal Singh Jamadar
Jarnail Sultan Mahmud Khan 
 Jarnail Sawant Mal 
 Jarnail Tej Singh
 Jarnail Raja Multan Chopra 
 Balbhadra Kunwar A Hindu Kshatriya of the Kunwar family of Gorkha
 Jarnail Lal Singh
 Jarnail Raja Ram Singh Pathania 
 Jarnail Mehta Basti Ram
 Jarnail Ram Singh Jamadar
 Jarnail Chandu Lal Malhotra 
 Jarnail Jean-Bapiste Ventura 
 Jarnail Claude Augustus Courte 
 Jarnail Jean-Francois Allard 
 Jarnail Pablo Di Avitable 
 Jarnail Oms
 Jarnail Alexander Gardener
 Jarnail Joshiah Harlan 
 Jarnail Honignberger 
 Kolonel Henry Steinbach 
 Jarnail Charles Van Cordant
 Jarnail Sheikh Illahi Baksh 
 Jarnail Imam Shah 
 Jarnail Mazhar Ali 
 Jarnail Muhammad Khan Zufar
 Jarnail Naziruddin Illahi 
 Jarnail Fakir Azzizuddin
 Jarnail Ghause Khan
 Jarnail Mian Ghausa 
 Jarnail Imam Ali Shah 
Jathedar Akali Phula Singh Ji
 Sardar Gurmukh Singh Lamba 
 Raja Fateh Singh Ahluwalia 
 Sardar Gulab Singh Pahuwindia 
 Jarnail Veer Singh Dhillon 
 Jarnail Hukum Singh Chimni
 Sardar Desa Singh Mathija 
 Sardar Dal Singh Naherna 
 Jarnail Karam Singh Ranghar
 Sardar Arjan Singh Rangargalia
 Sardar Diwan Singh Mann 
 Jarnail Fateh Singh Mann 
 Jarnail Mehtab Singh Bhinder
 Sardar Sangat Singh Grover
 Jarnail Fateh Singh Kalianvala 
 Maharaja Ranjit Singh
 Maharaja Nau Nihal Singh
 Maharaja Kharak Singh
 Maharaja Sher Singh
 Jathedar Akali Hanumant Singh Ji
 Jathedaar Badrinath Ji
 Jarnail Sher Singh Attariwala 
 Jarnail Budh Singh Sandhanwalia 
 Jarnail Chatter Singh Attariwala 
 Sardar Kahan Singh 
 Sardar Joga Singh Badesha
 Jarnail Dal Singh 
 Raja Gurdit Singh 
 Raja Ajit Singh 
 Jarnail Mit Singh Padhania
 Jarnail Ranjodh Singh Mathija

References

People of the Sikh Empire
History of Punjab
Ranjit Singh
Ranjit Singh